"Another World" is the ninth single by Japanese musical artist Gackt. It was released on September 5, 2001, and peaked at second place on the Oricon weekly chart and charted for seventeen weeks. In 2001, with sales of 255,640 copies, it was the 74th best selling single of the year. It is Gackt's best selling single with 285,550 copies sold. He performed the song at the annual New Year's Eve TV show, Kouhaku Uta Gassen.

Gackt used both songs as the introduction and opening to the "Moon Project, while the "Another World" promotional video was used as a preview for his co-written and co-starred 2003 film Moon Child. The music video was filmed in Hong Kong. The song is used in neue MEN's advertisement for Shiseido.

Track listing

References

2001 singles
Gackt songs
Songs written by Gackt
2001 songs